First Presbyterian Church is a historic Presbyterian church located at 12 W. Fort Streets in Marion, McDowell County, North Carolina. The congregation was established in 1845, and the current church building was constructed in 1923.  It is a one-story plus balcony Classical Revival style brick building set on a raised basement.  The front facade features a monumental Ionic order tetrastyle pedimented portico.

It was added to the National Register of Historic Places in 1991. It is located in the Main Street Historic District.

References

External links
Official website

Churches in Marion, North Carolina
Presbyterian churches in North Carolina
Churches on the National Register of Historic Places in North Carolina
Neoclassical architecture in North Carolina
Churches completed in 1923
National Register of Historic Places in McDowell County, North Carolina
Historic district contributing properties in North Carolina
Neoclassical church buildings in the United States